Rod Laver defeated Tony Roche in the final, 6–3, 6–4, 6–2 to win the gentlemen's singles tennis title at the 1968 Wimbledon Championships. It was the first edition of Wimbledon open to professional tennis players, a period in tennis history known as the Open Era.

John Newcombe was the defending champion, but was defeated in the fourth round by Arthur Ashe.

Seeds

  Rod Laver (champion)
  Ken Rosewall (fourth round)
  Andrés Gimeno (third round)
  John Newcombe (fourth round)
  Roy Emerson (fourth round)
  Manuel Santana (third round)
  Lew Hoad (third round)
  Pancho Gonzales (third round)
  Dennis Ralston (quarterfinals)
  Butch Buchholz (quarterfinals)
  Fred Stolle (fourth round)
  Tom Okker (quarterfinals)
  Arthur Ashe (semifinals)
  Cliff Drysdale (third round)
  Tony Roche (final)
  Nikola Pilić (first round)

Qualifying

Draw

Finals

Top half

Section 1

Section 2

Section 3

Section 4

Bottom half

Section 5

Section 6

Section 7

Section 8

References

External links

 1968 Wimbledon Championships – Men's draws and results at the International Tennis Federation

Men's Singles
Wimbledon Championship by year – Men's singles